Events in the year 1729 in Norway.

Incumbents
Monarch: Frederick IV

Events
9 August - Brita Alverns witch trail, one of the last witch trials in Scandinavia.

Arts and literature

Births

Deaths
Vincens Budde, military officer (born 1660).

See also

References